Ernst Umhauer (born 2 December 1989) is a French actor who is best known for his role as Claude Garcia in the 2012 film In The House, directed by François Ozon.

Life and career
Umhauer was born in Cherbourg, France, and was named after the famous painter Max Ernst. His father was a photographer.

He studied drama for three years at the "Maison des Jeunes et de la Culture” of Cherbourg and started to act in several short movies in 2009, before obtaining his first role in the film Le Cri, directed by Raphaël Mathié. In 2011, he appeared alongside Vincent Cassel in the film The Monk directed by Dominik Moll, in which he played a young novice.

In 2012, the French director François Ozon asked him to play the clever and puzzling young Claude Garcia in the film In The House, alongside Fabrice Luchini, Emmanuelle Seigner and Kristin Scott Thomas. His performance won him the 2013 Lumières Award for Most Promising Actor. and a nomination in the same category during the 38th Césars Award Ceremony, an award which handed down to Matthias Schoenaerts.

Filmography
 Le Cri (2009)
 The Monk  (2011) : The novice
 In The House (2012) : Claude Garcia
 Sire Gauvain et le Chevalier Vert (2014): Sire Gauvain
 Les Revenants (TV series)The Returned (2012-2015): Virgil
 Scarlet (2022)

Awards and nominations
Lumières Award for Most Promising Actor (2013)
Nomination for the César Award for Most Promising Actor (2013)

References

External links 

 

1989 births
Living people
French male film actors
People from Cherbourg-Octeville
Most Promising Actor Lumières Award winners
French male television actors
21st-century French male actors